Not So Long Ago is a 1925 American silent drama film produced by Jesse Lasky and Adolph Zukor and distributed by Paramount. It was directed by Sidney Olcott with Betty Bronson and Ricardo Cortez in the leading roles.

Plot
As described in a film magazine reviews, Betty, the daughter of Dover the inventor, works by the day as a seamstress in the Ballard home. Billy Ballard, the Beau Brummel of the town, is engaged to Ursula Kent, but Betty pretends to herself in her day dreams that he is in love with her. Sam Robinson, the town’s smart aleck, proposes to her and is indignant when she rejects him. Dover borrows money from Flint to continue the invention of his horseless carriage. When the time draws near for the notes to be paid to Flint, Dover is unable to pay them. Betty tells Sam that Billy has proposed to her. Sam tells this to her father who goes to the Ballard home. He tells Billy Ballard that he will expect the customary courtship between Betty and him (Billy). Billy then asks if he might call on Betty. At his first call, Flint attempts to collect the money for his notes. Billy offers to buy them but Betty will not permit him to do so. When Billy admits to Betty that he is engaged to Ursula, Betty becomes angry. But Billy finds that Ursula, like him, is in love with another. When their engagement is broken, Betty becomes reconciled. Flint has arranged with Dover to take the horseless carriage on the following day. Robinson has wagered with Dover that he can beat the machine in a walk down Fifth Avenue. The race is held but as the engine finishes the race a winner the boiler explodes and destroys the entire machine. Flint cannot take it away but receives the money from Billy, who promises to back Dover in building a new one. Betty is happy with her engagement to Billy.

Cast

Preservation
With no prints of Not So Long Ago located in any film archives, it is a lost film.

References

External links
 
 
 
  Not So Long Ago website dedicated to Sidney Olcott

1925 films
American silent feature films
Famous Players-Lasky films
Films directed by Sidney Olcott
1925 romantic comedy films
American romantic comedy films
American black-and-white films
Lost American films
Lost romantic comedy films
1920s American films
Silent romantic comedy films
Silent American comedy films